Architectural Forum was an American magazine that covered the homebuilding industry and architecture.  Started in Boston, Massachusetts, in 1892 as The Brickbuilder, it absorbed the magazine Architect's World in October 1938. Ownership of the Forum passed from Time, Inc., Urban America, Inc., Whitney Publications, and finally to Billboard Publications in 1972. After the purchase of the Forum by Billboard, Peter Blake, its chief editor, and much of the staff left to form the magazine Architecture Plus in 1973. The Forum ceased publication in 1974.

Graphic designer Paul Rand designed two covers for the March and April 1945 issues.

Content 
The journal was published under various names throughout its history:
 1892–1916: The Brickbuilder
 1917–1974: Architectural Forum

For a time, the journal was branded with a subtitle, The Magazine of Building.

194X 
194X was a term first used in the October 1943 issue of Architectural Forum. The issue focused on post-war urban and city planning, with the 'X' standing for the assumed end date of the war. The issue contained plans for shopping centers, housing, and schools based on the needs and size of a population.  This was part of a larger shift in American culture, as many thought the end of the war would usher in a new era of architecture and urbanization that slowed down due to the war.

Further reading 
Shanken, Andrew Michael. 194X: Architecture, Planning, and Consumer Culture on the American Home Front. University of Minnesota Press, 2009.

References

External links
 Full catalog record of The Brickbuilder at HathiTrust
 Full catalog record of Architectural Forum at HathiTrust
 Full catalog at USModernist

Architecture magazines
Defunct magazines published in the United States
Magazines established in 1892
Magazines disestablished in 1974
Magazines published in Boston